Yoga as exercise is a physical activity consisting mainly of postures, often connected by flowing sequences, sometimes accompanied by breathing exercises, and frequently ending with relaxation lying down or meditation. Yoga in this form has become familiar across the world, especially in America and Europe. It is derived from medieval Haṭha yoga, which made use of similar postures, but it is generally simply called "yoga". Academics have given yoga as exercise a variety of names, including modern postural yoga and transnational anglophone yoga.

Posture is described in the Yoga Sutras II.29 as the third of the eight limbs, the ashtanga, of yoga.  
Sutra II.46 defines it as that which is steady and comfortable, but no further elaboration or list of postures is given.

Postures were not central in any of the older traditions of yoga; posture practice was revived in the 1920s by yoga gurus including Yogendra and Kuvalayananda, who emphasised its health benefits. The flowing sequences of Surya Namaskar (Salute to the Sun) were pioneered by the Rajah of Aundh, Bhawanrao Shrinivasrao Pant Pratinidhi, in the 1920s. It and many standing poses used in gymnastics were incorporated into yoga by the yoga teacher Krishnamacharya in Mysore from the 1930s to the 1950s. Several of his students went on to found influential schools of yoga: Pattabhi Jois created Ashtanga Vinyasa Yoga, which in turn led to Power Yoga; B. K. S. Iyengar created Iyengar Yoga, and defined a modern set of yoga postures in his 1966 book Light on Yoga; and Indra Devi taught yoga as exercise to many celebrities in Hollywood. Other major schools founded in the 20th century include Bikram Yoga and Sivananda Yoga. Yoga as exercise spread across America and Europe, and then the rest of the world.

Haṭha yoga's non-postural practices such as its purifications are much reduced or absent in yoga as exercise. The term "hatha yoga" is also in use with a different meaning, a gentle unbranded yoga practice, independent of the major schools, often mainly for women. Practices vary from wholly secular, for exercise and relaxation, through to undoubtedly spiritual, whether in traditions like Sivananda Yoga or in personal rituals. Yoga as exercise's relationship to Hinduism is complex and contested; some Christians have rejected it on the grounds that it is covertly Hindu, while the "Take Back Yoga" campaign insisted that it was necessarily connected to Hinduism. Scholars have identified multiple trends in the changing nature of yoga since the end of the 19th century. Yoga as exercise has developed into a worldwide multi-billion dollar business, involving classes, certification of teachers, clothing such as yoga pants, books, videos, equipment including yoga mats, and holidays.

History

Yoga's origins

The Sanskrit noun योग , cognate with English "yoke", is derived from the root  "to attach, join, harness, yoke". Its ancient spiritual and philosophical goal was to unite the human spirit with the divine. The branch of yoga that makes use of physical postures is Haṭha yoga. The Sanskrit word हठ haṭha means "force", alluding to its use of physical techniques.

Haṭha yoga

Haṭha yoga flourished among secretive ascetic groups such as Nath yogins in South Asia from c. 1100-c. 1900. Instruction was directly from guru to individual pupil, in a long-term relationship. It was associated with religions, especially Hinduism but also Jainism and Buddhism. Its objectives were to manipulate vital fluids to enable absorption and ultimately liberation. It consisted of practices including purifications, postures (asanas), locks, the directed gaze, seals, and rhythmic breathing. These were claimed to provide supernatural powers including healing, destruction of poisons, invisibility, and shape-shifting. Yogins wore little or no clothing; their bodies were sometimes smeared with cremation ash as a reminder of their forthcoming deaths. Equipment, too, was scanty; sometimes yogins used a tiger or deer skin as a rug to meditate on. Hatha yoga made use of a small number of asanas, mainly seated; in particular, there were very few standing poses before 1900. They were practised slowly, often holding a position for long periods. The practice of asanas was a minor preparatory aspect of spiritual work. Yogins followed a strict vegetarian diet, excluding stimulants such as tea, coffee or alcohol. Their yoga was taught without payment; gurus were supported by gifts and the philosophy was anti-consumerist.

Early influences 

According to one theory, the system of physical education practised in the 19th-century Young Men's Christian Association, adapted by ex-military gymnasts for the schooling system in colonial British India, became the default form of mass-drill, and this influenced the "modernized hatha yoga". According to the yoga scholar Suzanne Newcombe, modern yoga in India is a blend of Western gymnastics with postures from Haṭha yoga in India in the 20th century.

From the 1850s onwards, there developed in India a culture of physical exercise to counter the colonial stereotype of supposed "degeneracy" of Indians compared to the British, a belief reinforced by then-current ideas of Lamarckism and eugenics. This culture was taken up from the 1880s to the early 20th century by Indian nationalists such as Tiruka, who taught exercises and unarmed combat techniques under the guise of yoga. The German bodybuilder Eugen Sandow was acclaimed on his 1905 visit to India, at which time he was already a "cultural hero" in the country. The anthropologist Joseph Alter suggests that Sandow was the person who had the most influence on modern yoga. The first handbook of asanas in English, and the first to be illustrated with photographs, was Seetharaman Sundaram's 1928 Yogic Physical Culture.

Introduction to the West 

Yoga was introduced to the Western world by the spiritual leader Vivekananda's 1893 visit to the World Parliament of Religions in Chicago, and his 1896 book Raja Yoga. However, he rejected Haṭha yoga and its "entirely" physical practices such as asanas as difficult and ineffective for spiritual growth, out of a widely shared distaste for India's wandering yogins. Yoga asanas were brought to America by the yoga teacher Yogendra. He founded a branch of The Yoga Institute in New York state in 1919, starting to make Haṭha yoga acceptable, seeking scientific evidence for its health benefits, and writing books such as his 1928 Yoga Asanas Simplified and his 1931 Yoga Personal Hygiene. The flowing sequences of salute to the sun, Surya Namaskar, now accepted as yoga and containing popular asanas such as Uttanasana and upward and downward dog poses, were popularized by the Rajah of Aundh, Bhawanrao Shrinivasrao Pant Pratinidhi, in the 1920s.

In 1924, the yoga teacher Kuvalayananda founded the Kaivalyadhama Health and Yoga Research Center in Maharashtra, combining asanas with gymnastics, and like Yogendra seeking a scientific and medical basis for yogic practices.

In 1925, Kuvalayananda's rival Paramahansa Yogananda, having moved from India to America, set up the Self-Realization Fellowship in Los Angeles, and taught yoga, including asanas, breathing, chanting and meditation, to "tens of thousands of Americans". In 1923, Yogananda's younger brother, Bishnu Charan Ghosh, founded the Ghosh College of Yoga and Physical Culture in Calcutta.

Tirumalai Krishnamacharya (1888–1989), "the father of modern yoga", claimed to have spent seven years with one of the few masters of Haṭha yoga then living, Ramamohana Brahmachari, at Lake Manasarovar in Tibet, from 1912 to 1918. He studied under Kuvalayananda in the 1930s, and then in his yogashala in the Jaganmohan Palace in Mysore created "a marriage of Haṭha yoga, wrestling exercises, and modern Western gymnastic movement, and unlike anything seen before in the yoga tradition."  The Maharajah of Mysore Krishna Raja Wadiyar IV was a leading advocate of physical culture in India, and a neighbouring hall of his palace was used to teach Surya Namaskar classes, then considered to be gymnastic exercises. Krishnamacharya adapted these sequences of exercises into his flowing vinyasa style of yoga. The yoga scholar Mark Singleton noted that gymnastic systems like Niels Bukh's were popular in physical culture in India at that time, and that they contained many postures similar to Krishnamacharya's new asanas.

Among Krishnamacharya's pupils were people who became influential yoga teachers themselves: the Russian Eugenie V. Peterson, known as Indra Devi (from 1937), who moved to Hollywood, taught yoga to celebrities, and wrote the bestselling book Forever Young, Forever Healthy; Pattabhi Jois (from 1927), who founded the flowing style Ashtanga Vinyasa Yoga whose Mysore style makes use of repetitions of Surya Namaskar, in 1948, which in turn led to Power Yoga; and B.K.S. Iyengar (from 1933), his brother-in-law, who founded Iyengar Yoga, with its first centre in Britain. Together they made yoga popular as exercise and brought it to the Western world. Iyengar's 1966 book Light on Yoga popularised yoga asanas worldwide with what the scholar-practitioner Norman Sjoman calls its "clear no-nonsense descriptions and the obvious refinement of the illustrations", though the degree of precision it calls for is missing from earlier yoga texts.

Other Indian schools of yoga took up the new style of asanas, but continued to emphasize Haṭha yoga's spiritual goals and practices to varying extents. The Divine Life Society was founded by Sivananda Saraswati of Rishikesh in 1936. His many disciples include Swami Vishnudevananda, who founded the International Sivananda Yoga Vedanta Centres, starting in 1959; Swami Satyananda of the Bihar School of Yoga, a major centre of Haṭha yoga teacher training, founded in 1963; and Swami Satchidananda of Integral Yoga, founded in 1966. Vishnudevananda published his Complete Illustrated Book of Yoga in 1960, with a list of asanas that substantially overlaps with Iyengar's, sometimes with different names for the same poses; Jois's asana names almost exactly match Iyengar's.

Worldwide commodity 

Three changes around the 1960s allowed yoga as exercise to become a worldwide commodity. People were for the first time able to travel freely around the world: consumers could go to the east; Indians could migrate to Europe and America; and business people and religious leaders could go where they liked to sell their wares. Secondly, people across the Western world became disillusioned with organised religion, and started to look for alternatives. And thirdly, yoga became an uncontroversial form of exercise suitable for mass consumption, unlike the more religious or meditational forms of modern yoga such as Siddha Yoga or Transcendental Meditation. This involved the dropping of many traditional requirements on the practice of yoga, such as giving alms, being celibate, studying the Hindu scriptures, and retreating from society.

From the 1970s, yoga as exercise spread across many countries of the world, changing as it did so, and becoming "an integral part of (primarily) urban cultures worldwide", to the extent that the word yoga in the Western world now means the practice of asanas, typically in a class. For example, Iyengar Yoga reached South Africa in 1979 with the opening of its institute at Pietermaritzburg; its Association of South East & East Asia was founded in 2009. Yoga's spread in America was assisted by the television show Lilias, Yoga and You, hosted by Lilias Folan; it ran from 1970 to 1999. In Australia, by 2005 some 12% of the population practised yoga in a class or at home. As a valuable business, yoga has in turn been used in advertising, sometimes for yoga-related products, sometimes for other goods and services. 

The market for yoga grew, argues the scholar of religion Andrea Jain, with the creation of an "endless" variety of second-generation yoga brands, saleable products, "constructed and marketed for immediate consumption", based on earlier developments. For example, in 1997 John Friend, once a financial analyst, who had intensively studied both the postural Iyengar Yoga and the non-postural Siddha Yoga, founded Anusara Yoga. Friend likened the choice of his yoga over other brands to choosing "a fine restaurant" over "a fast-food joint"; The New York Times Magazine headed its piece on him "The Yoga Mogul", while the historian of yoga Stefanie Syman argued that Friend had "very self-consciously" created his own yoga community. For example, Friend published his own teacher training manual, held workshops, conferences, and festivals, marketed his own brand of yoga mats and water bottles, and prescribed ethical guidelines. When Friend did not live up to the brand's high standards, he apologised publicly and took steps to protect the brand, in 2012 stepping back from running it and appointing a CEO.

Jain states that yoga is becoming "part of pop culture around the world". Alter writes that it illustrates "transnational transmutation and the blurring of consumerism, holistic health, and embodied mysticism—as well as good old-fashioned Orientalism." Singleton argues that the commodity is the yoga body itself, its "spiritual possibility" signified by the "lucent skin of the yoga model", a beautiful image endlessly sold back to the yoga-practising public "as an irresistible commodity of the holistic, perfectible self".

In 2008, the United States Department of Health and Human Services labelled September as National Yoga Month. From 2015, at the suggestion of India's Prime Minister, Narendra Modi, an annual International Day of Yoga has been held on 21 June.

Transformation 

The anthropologist Sarah Strauss contrasts the goal of classical yoga, the isolation of the self or kaivalya, with the modern goals of good health, reduced stress, and physical flexibility. Sjoman notes that many of the asanas in Iyengar's Light on Yoga can be traced to his teacher, Krishnamacharya, "but not beyond him". Singleton states that yoga used as exercise is not "the outcome of a direct and unbroken lineage of haṭha yoga", but it would be "going too far to say that modern postural yoga has no relationship to asana practice within the Indian tradition." The contemporary yoga practice is the result of "radical innovation and experimentation" of its Indian heritage. Jain writes that equating yoga as exercise with hatha yoga "does not account for the historical sources": asanas "only became prominent in modern yoga in the early twentieth century as a result of the dialogical exchanges between Indian reformers and nationalists and Americans and Europeans interested in health and fitness". In short, Jain writes, "modern yoga systems ... bear little resemblance to the yoga systems that preceded them. This is because [both] ... are specific to their own social contexts." The historian Jared Farmer writes that twelve trends have characterised yoga's progression from the 1890s onwards: from peripheral to central in society; from India to global; from male to "predominantly" female; from spiritual to "mostly" secular; from sectarian to universal; from mendicant to consumerist; from meditational to postural; from being understood intellectually to experientially; from embodying esoteric knowledge to being accessible to all; from being taught orally to hands-on instruction; from presenting poses in text to using photographs; and from being "contorted social pariahs" to "lithe social winners". The trend away from authority is continued in post-lineage yoga, which is practised outside any major school or guru's lineage.

Practices

Asanas 

Yoga as exercise consists largely but not exclusively of the practice of asanas. The numbers of asanas described (not just named) in some major Haṭha yoga and modern texts are shown in the table; all the Haṭha yoga text dates are approximate.

Asanas can be classified in different ways, which may overlap: for example, by the position of the head and feet (standing, sitting, reclining, inverted), by whether balancing is required, or by the effect on the spine (forward bend, backbend, twist), giving a set of asana types agreed by most authors. The yoga guru Dharma Mittra uses his own categories such as "Floor & Supine Poses". Yogapedia and Yoga Journal add "Hip-opening"; the yoga teacher Darren Rhodes, Yogapedia and Yoga Journal also add "Core strength".

Styles 

The number of schools and styles of yoga in the Western world has continued to grow rapidly. By 2012, there were at least 19 widespread styles from Ashtanga Yoga to Viniyoga. These emphasise different aspects including aerobic exercise, precision in the asanas, and spirituality in the Haṭha yoga tradition.

These aspects can be illustrated by schools with distinctive styles. Iyengar Yoga emphasises correct alignment in the postures, working slowly, if necessary with props, and ending with relaxation. Sivananda Yoga focuses more on spiritual practice, with 12 basic poses, chanting in Sanskrit, pranayama breathing exercises, meditation, and relaxation in each class, and importance is placed on vegetarian diet. Jivamukti Yoga uses a flowing vinyasa style of asanas accompanied by music, chanting, and the reading of scriptures. Kundalini yoga emphasises the awakening of kundalini energy through meditation, pranayama, chanting, and suitable asanas.

Alongside the yoga brands, many teachers, for example in England, offer an unbranded "hatha yoga", often mainly to women, creating their own combinations of poses. These may be in flowing sequences (vinyasas), and new variants of poses are often created. The gender imbalance has sometimes been marked; in Britain in the 1970s, women formed between 70 and 90 percent of most yoga classes, as well as most of the yoga teachers.

The tradition begun by Krishnamacharya survives at the Krishnamacharya Yoga Mandiram in Chennai; his son T. K. V. Desikachar and his grandson Kausthub Desikachar continued to teach in small groups, coordinating asana movements with the breath, and personalising the teaching according to the needs of individual students.

Sessions 

Yoga sessions vary widely depending on the school and style, and according to how advanced the class is. As with any exercise class, sessions usually start slowly with gentle warm-up exercises, move on to more vigorous exercises, and slow down again towards the end. A beginners' class can begin with simple poses like Sukhasana, some rounds of Surya Namaskar, and then a combination of standing poses such as Trikonasana, sitting poses like Dandasana, and balancing poses like Navasana; it may end with some reclining and inverted poses like Setu Bandha Sarvangasana and Viparita Karani, a reclining twist, and finally Savasana for relaxation and in some styles also for a guided meditation. A typical session in most styles lasts from an hour to an hour and a half, whereas in Mysore style yoga, the class is scheduled in a three-hour time window during which the students practice on their own at their own speed, following individualised instruction by the teacher.

Hybrids 

The evolution of yoga as exercise is not confined to the creation of new asanas and linking vinyasa sequences. A wide variety of hybrid activities combining yoga with martial arts, aerial yoga combined with acrobatics, yoga with barre work (as in ballet preparation), on horseback, with dogs, with goats, with ring-tailed lemurs, with weights, and on paddleboards are all being explored.

Purposes

Exercise 

The energy cost of exercise is measured in units of metabolic equivalent of task (MET). Less than 3 METs counts as light exercise; 3 to 6 METs is moderate; 6 or over is vigorous. American College of Sports Medicine and American Heart Association guidelines count periods of at least 10 minutes of moderate MET level activity towards their recommended daily amounts of exercise. For healthy adults aged 18 to 65, the guidelines recommend moderate exercise for 30 minutes five days a week, or vigorous aerobic exercise for 20 minutes three days a week. 

Treated as a form of exercise, a complete yoga session with asanas and pranayama provides 3.3 ± 1.6 METs, on average a moderate workout. Surya Namaskar ranged from a light 2.9 to a vigorous 7.4 METs; the average for a session of yoga practice without Surya Namaskar was a light 2.9 ± 0.8 METs.

Physical or Hindu 

Since the mid-20th century, yoga has been used, especially in the Western world, as physical exercise for fitness and suppleness, rather than for what the historian of American yoga, Stefanie Syman, calls any "overtly Hindu" purpose. In 2010, this ambiguity triggered what the New York Times called "a surprisingly fierce debate in the gentle world of yoga". Some saffronising Indian-Americans campaigned to "Take Back Yoga" by informing Americans and other Westerners about the connection between yoga and Hinduism. The campaign was criticised by the New Age author Deepak Chopra, but supported by the president of the Southern Baptist Theological Seminary, R. Albert Mohler Jr. Jain notes that yoga is not necessarily Hindu, as it can also be Jain or Buddhist; nor is it homogeneous or static, so she is critical of both what she calls the "Christian yogaphobic position" and the "Hindu origins position". Farmer writes that Syman identifies a Protestant streak in yoga as exercise, "with its emphasis on working the body. This effortful yoga is, she says, paradoxical, both 'an indulgence and a penance'."

Authorities differ on whether yoga is purely exercise. For example, in 2012, New York state decided that yoga was exempt from state sales tax as it did not constitute "true exercise", whereas in 2014 the District of Columbia was clear that yoga premises were subject to the local sales tax on premises "the purpose of which is physical exercise". Similar debates have taken place in a Muslim context; for example, restrictions on yoga have been lifted in Saudi Arabia. In Malaysia, Kuala Lumpur permits yoga classes provided they do not include chanting or meditation. The yoga teacher and author Mira Mehta, asked by Yoga Magazine in 2010 whether she preferred her pupils to commit to a spiritual path before they start yoga, replied "Certainly not. A person's spiritual life is his or her own affair. People come to yoga for all sorts of reasons. High on the list is health and the desire to become de-stressed." Kimberley J. Pingatore, studying attitudes among American yoga practitioners, found that they did not view the categories of religious, spiritual, and secular as alternatives.

However, Haṭha yoga's "ecstatic ... transcendent ... possibly subversive" elements remain in yoga used as exercise.The yoga teacher and author Jessamyn Stanley writes that modern Western society "does not respect the esoteric or spiritual at all", making people skeptical about any alignment of yoga as practised in the West with "chakras or spirituality". Stanley states that it is possible to start a practice without considering such matters, and that styles such as Bikram do not mention them, but that a deepening yoga practice will bring "an overall evolution of the self". Syman suggests that part of the attraction of Bikram and Ashtanga Yoga was that under the sweat, the commitment, the schedule, the physical demands and even the verbal abuse was a hard-won ecstasy, "a deep feeling of vitality, a feeling of pure energy, an unbowed posture, and mental acuity". That context has led to a division of opinion among Christians, some like Alexandra Davis of the Evangelical Alliance asserting that it is acceptable as long as they are aware of modern yoga's origins, others like Paul Gosbee stating that yoga's purpose is to "open up chakras" and release kundalini or "serpent power" which in Gosbee's view is "from Satan", making "Christian yoga ... a contradiction". Church halls are sometimes used for yoga, and in 2015 a yoga group was banned from a church hall in Bristol by the local parochial church council, stating that yoga represented "alternative spiritualities".

In a secular context, the journalists Nell Frizzell and Reni Eddo-Lodge have debated (in The Guardian) whether Western yoga classes represent "cultural appropriation". In Frizzell's view, yoga has become a new entity, a long way from the Yoga Sutras of Patanjali, and while some practitioners are culturally insensitive, others treat it with more respect. Eddo-Lodge agrees that Western yoga is far from Patanjali, but argues that the changes cannot be undone, whether people use it "as a holier-than-thou tool, as a tactic to balance out excessive drug use, or practised similarly to its origins with the spirituality that comes with it". Jain argues however that charges of appropriation "from 'the East' to 'the West'" fail to take account of the fact that yoga is evolving in a shared multinational process; it is not something that is being stolen from one place by another.

Health 

Yoga as exercise has been popularized in the Western world by claims about its health benefits. The history of such claims was reviewed by William J. Broad in his 2012 book The Science of Yoga; he states that the claims that yoga was scientific began as Hindu nationalist posturing. Among the early exponents was Kuvalayananda, who attempted to demonstrate scientifically in his purpose-built 1924 laboratory at Kaivalyadhama that Sarvangasana (shoulderstand) specifically rehabilitated the endocrine glands (the organs that secrete hormones). He found no evidence to support such a claim, for this or any other asana.

The impact of yoga as exercise on physical and mental health has been a topic of systematic studies (evaluating primary research), although a 2014 report found that, despite its common practice and possible health benefits, it remained "extremely understudied". A systematic review of six studies found that Iyengar yoga is effective at least in the short term for both neck pain and low back pain. A review of six studies found benefits for depression, but noted that the studies' methods imposed limitations, while a clinical practice guideline from the American Cancer Society stated that yoga may reduce anxiety and stress in people with cancer. A 2015 systematic review called for more rigour in clinical trials of the effect of yoga on mood and measures of stress.

The practice of asanas has been claimed to improve flexibility, strength, and balance; to alleviate stress and anxiety, and to reduce the symptoms of lower back pain. A review of five studies noted that three psychological (positive affect, mindfulness, self-compassion) and four biological mechanisms (posterior hypothalamus, interleukin-6, C-reactive protein and cortisol) that might act on stress had been examined empirically, whereas many other potential mechanisms remained to be studied; four of the mechanisms (positive affect, self-compassion, inhibition of the posterior hypothalamus and salivary cortisol) were found to mediate the potential stress-lowering effects of yoga. A 2017 review found moderate-quality evidence that yoga reduces back pain. For people with cancer, yoga may help relieve fatigue, improve psychological outcomes, and support sleep quality and life attitudes, although results vary from reviews published in 2017.

A 2015 systematic review noted that yoga may be effective in alleviating symptoms of prenatal depression. There is evidence that practice of asanas improves birth outcomes and physical health and quality of life measures in the elderly, and reduces hypertension.

Secular religion 

From its origins in the 1920s, yoga used as exercise has had a "spiritual" aspect which is not necessarily neo-Hindu; its assimilation with Harmonial Gymnastics is an example. Jain calls yoga as exercise "a sacred fitness regimen set apart from day-to-day life." The yoga therapist Ann Swanson writes that "scientific principles and evidence have demystified [yoga, but] ... surprisingly, this made my transformative experiences feel even more magical." Yoga practice sessions have, notes yoga scholar Elizabeth De Michelis, a highly specific three-part structure that matches Arnold van Gennep's 1908 definition of the basic structure of a ritual:

   1. a separation phase (detaching from the world outside);

   2. a transition or liminal state; and

   3. an incorporation or postliminal state.

For the separation phase, the yoga session begins by going into a neutral and if possible a secluded practice hall; worries, responsibilities, ego and shoes are all left outside; and the yoga teacher is treated with deference. The actual yoga practice forms the transition state, combining practical instructions with theory, made more or less explicit. The practitioner learns "to feel and to perceive in novel ways, most of all inwardly"; to "become silent and receptive" to help to get away from the "ego-dominated rationality of modern Western life". The final relaxation forms the incorporation phase; the practitioner relaxes in Savasana, just as dictated by the Hatha Yoga Pradipika 1.32. The posture offers "an exercise in sense withdrawal and mental quietening, and thus ... a first step towards meditative practice", a cleansing and healing process, and even a symbolic death and moment of self-renewal. Iyengar writes that savasana puts the practitioner in "that precise state [where] the body, the breath, the mind and the brain move toward the real self (Atma)" so as to merge into the Infinite, thus explaining the modern yoga healing ritual in terms of the Hindu Vishishtadvaita: an explanation that, De Michelis notes, practitioners are free to follow if they wish.

The yoga scholar Elliott Goldberg notes that some practitioners of yoga as exercise "inhabit their body as a means of accessing the spiritual... they use their asana practice as a vehicle for transcendence." He cites yoga teacher Vanda Scaravelli's 1991 Awakening the Spine as an instance of such transcendence: "We learn to elongate and extend, rather than to pull and push... [and so] an unexpected opening follows, an opening from within us, giving life to the spine, as though the body had to reverse and awaken into another dimension."

In mindful yoga, the practice of asanas is combined with pranayama and meditation, using the breath and sometimes Buddhist Vipassana meditation techniques to bring the attention to the body and the emotions, thus quietening the mind.

Competition 

The idea of competitive yoga has been called an oxymoron by some people in the yoga community, such as the yoga teacher Maja Sidebaeck, but the fiercely contested Bishnu Charan Ghosh Cup, founded by Bikram Choudhury in 2003, is now held annually in Los Angeles.

Business 

By the 21st century, yoga as exercise had become a flourishing business, professionally marketed; a 2016 Ipsos study reported that 36.7 million Americans practise yoga, making the business of classes, clothing and equipment worth $16 billion in America, compared to $10 billion in 2012, and $80 billion worldwide. 72 percent of practitioners were women. By 2010, Yoga Journal, founded in 1975, had some 350,000 subscribers and over 1,300,000 readers.

Clothing and equipment 

Fashion has entered the world of yoga, with brands such as Lorna Jane and Lululemon offering their own ranges of women's yoga clothing. Sales of goods such as yoga mats are increasing rapidly; sales are projected to rise to $14 billion by 2020 in North America, where the key vendors in 2016 were Barefoot Yoga, Gaiam, Jade Yoga, and Manduka, according to Technavio. Sales of athleisure clothing such as yoga pants were worth $35 billion in 2014, forming 17% of American clothing sales. A wide variety of instructional videos are available, some free, for yoga practice at beginner and advanced levels; by 2018, over 6,000 commercially produced titles were on sale. Over 1,000 books have been published on yoga poses. Yoga has reached high fashion, too: in 2011, the fashion house Gucci, noting the "halo of chic" around yoga-practising celebrities such as Madonna and Sting, produced a yoga mat costing $850 and a matching carry case in leather for $350.

In India, participants typically wear loose-fitting clothes for yoga classes, while serious practitioners in yoga ashrams practice an arduous combination of exercise, meditation, selfless service, vegetarian diet and celibacy, making yoga a way of life.

Holidays and training 

Yoga holidays (vacations) are offered in "idyllic" places around the world, including in Croatia, England, France, Greece, Iceland, Indonesia, India, Italy, Montenegro, Morocco, Portugal, Romania, Spain, Sri Lanka, Thailand, and Turkey; in 2018, prices were up to £1,295 (about $1,500) for 6 days.

Teacher training, as of 2017, could cost between $2,000 and $5,000. It can take up to 3 years to obtain a teaching certificate. Yoga training courses, as of 2017, were still unregulated in the UK; the British Wheel of Yoga has been appointed the activity's official governing body by Sport England, but it lacks power to compel training organisations, and many people are taking short unaccredited courses rather than one of the nine so far accredited.

Copyright claims 

Bikram Yoga has become a global brand, and its founder, Bikram Choudhury, spent some ten years from 2002 attempting to establish copyright on the sequence of 26 postures used in Bikram Yoga, with some initial success. However, in 2012, the American federal court ruled that Bikram Yoga could not be copyrighted. In 2015, after further legal action, the American court of appeals ruled that the yoga sequence and breathing exercises were not eligible for copyright protection.

In culture

Literature 

Yoga has found its way into types of literature as varied as autobiography, chick lit, and documentary. The actress Mariel Hemingway's 2002 autobiography Finding My Balance: A Memoir with Yoga describes how she used yoga to recover balance in her life after a dysfunctional upbringing: among other things, her grandfather, the novelist Ernest Hemingway, killed himself shortly before she was born. Each chapter is titled after an asana, the first being "Mountain Pose, or Tadasana", the posture of standing in balance.
The teacher of yoga and mindful meditation Anne Cushman's 2009 novel Enlightenment for Idiots tells the story of a woman nearing the age of thirty whose life as a nanny and yogini hopeful isn't working out as expected, and is sure that a visit to the ashrams of India will sort out her life. Instead, she finds that nothing in India is quite what it seems on the surface. The Yoga Journal review notes that underneath the chick lit "fun romp", the book is a serious "call to enlightenment and an introduction to yoga philosophy".

Kate Churchill's 2009 film Enlighten Up! follows an unemployed journalist for six months as, on the filmmaker's invitation, he travels the globe – New York, Boulder, California, Hawaii, India – to practise under yoga masters including Jois, Norman Allen, and Iyengar. The critic Roger Ebert found it interesting and peaceful, if "not terribly eventful, but I suppose we wouldn't want a yoga thriller". He commented: "I'm glad I saw it. I enjoyed all the people I met during Nick's six-month quest. Most seemed cheerful and outgoing, and exuded good health. They smiled a lot. They weren't creepy true believers obsessed with converting everyone."

Research 

Yoga is becoming a subject of academic inquiry; many of the researchers are "scholar practitioners" who do yoga themselves. Medknow (part of Wolters Kluwer), with Swami Vivekananda Yoga Anusandhana Samsthana university, publishes the peer-reviewed open access medical journal International Journal of Yoga. An increasing number of papers are being published on the possible medical benefits of yoga, such as on stress and low back pain. The School of Oriental and African Studies in London has created a Centre of Yoga Studies; it hosted the five-year Hatha Yoga Project which traced the history of physical yoga, and it teaches a master's degree in yoga and meditation.

Academics have given yoga as exercise a variety of names, including "modern postural yoga" reflecting its emphasis on asanas (postures) and "transnational anglophone yoga" denoting its growth in the English-speaking world, especially America.

Notes

References

Sources

External links

Modern Yoga Research website, managed by the scholars Elizabeth De Michelis, Suzanne Newcombe, and Mark Singleton
What's behind the five popular yoga poses loved by the world? – a BBC Seriously... program and web page by Mukti Jain Campion

 
Yoga
Physical exercise